The Football Conference season of 1994–95 was the sixteenth season of the Football Conference, also known as the Vauxhall Conference for sponsorship reasons.

Overview
Macclesfield Town finished the season as Conference champions, but failed to gain Football League status as their stadium failed to meet the capacity requirements. This meant that the bottom placed Third Division club, Exeter City, avoided relegation to the Conference.

New teams in the league this season
 Farnborough Town (promoted 1993–94)
 Stevenage Borough (promoted 1993–94)

Final  league table

Results

Promotion and relegation

Promoted
 Hednesford Town (from the Southern Premier League)
 Morecambe (from the Northern Premier League)
 Slough Town (from the Isthmian League)

Relegated
 Merthyr Tydfil (to the Southern Premier League)
 Stafford Rangers (to the Northern Premier League)
 Yeovil Town (to the Isthmian League)

Top scorers in order of league goals

References

External links
 1994–95 Conference National Results

National League (English football) seasons
5